The 1881–82 Scottish Districts season is a record of all the  rugby union matches for Scotland's district teams.

It includes the East of Scotland District versus West of Scotland District trial match.

History

This season saw the first time that Glasgow won the Inter-City match.

After last season's failed attempt to get a North v South fixture played, it was proposed that now 3 new district fixtures be played.

From the Aberdeen Press and Journal of 19 December 1881:

At the recent annual meeting of the union [SRU] Mr. R. Craigie Bell of Aberdeenshire, renewed this solicitations on their behalf and on behalf on their provincial friends generally, and in addition to the North versus South match, proposed the introduction of two other Union fixtures viz. the Northern versus Midland counties and a South-eastern versus South-western counties match. The union accordingly gave the proposal their best consideration, and chiefly through Mr. Petrie's personal inquiries, and perhaps in consequence of hailing from Banff himself, and thus having a 'weak side' towards the north, the northern counties match was agreed to...

The Midlands District side was formed to play a North of Scotland District side for the first time on 17 December 1881.

The North versus South fixture was played this season for the first time on 31 December 1881.

Results

Inter-City

Glasgow District: David Kidston (Glasgow Academicals), A. J. W. Reid (West of Scotland), C. W. Dunlop (West of Scotland),John Alexander Neilson (West of Scotland) and C. Ker (Glasgow Academicals),D. Y. Cassels (West of Scotland) [captain], David McCowan (West of Scotland), Archibald Walker (West of Scotland), R. Adam (West of Scotland), R. B. Young (Glasgow University), J. Lang (Glasgow University),John Blair Brown (Glasgow Academicals), R. A. Kerr (Glasgow Academicals), William Andrew Walls (Glasgow Academicals), George Robb (Glasgow Academicals)

Edinburgh District:  J. P. Veitch (Royal HSFP), John Clegg (Edinburgh University), G. Lindsay (Loretto), G. T. Chadwick (Edinburgh University), W. S. Brown (Edinburgh Institution F.P.), A. Philp (Edinburgh Institution F.P.), R. Ainslie (Edinburgh Institution F.P.), D. Somerville (Edinburgh Institution F.P.), Robert Maitland (Edinburgh Institution F.P.), G. Macleod (Edinburgh Wanderers), G. Morrison (Edinburgh Wanderers), R. S. F. Henderson (Edinburgh University), F. Bateson (Edinburgh University), T. Jeffrey (Edinburgh Academicals), J. Wilson (Royal HSFP)

Other Scottish matches

North: 

Midlands:

North: 

South:

East: J. P. Veitch (Royal HSFP), J. Glegg (Edinburgh University), A. Philp (Edinburgh Institution F.P.), W. S. Brown (Edinburgh Institution F.P.), W. K. Morton (Edinburgh University), R. Ainslie (Edinburgh Institution F.P.) [captain], T. Ainslie (Edinburgh Institution F.P.), D. Somerville (Edinburgh Institution F.P.), R. S. F. Henderson (Edinburgh University), G. B. Guthrie (Edinburgh University), John Tod (Edinburgh University), G. McLeod (Edinburgh Wanderers), T. Jeffrey (Edinburgh Academicals), N. Watt (Royal HSFP), J. Wilson (Royal HSFP)

West: D. W. Kidston (Glasgow Academicals), R. Campbell (Glasgow Academicals), C. W. Dunlop (West of Scotland), C. Kerr (Glasgow University), J. Adamson (West of Scotland), D. Y. Cassells (West of Scotland) [captain], J. Adam (West of Scotland), A. Walker (West of Scotland), J. B. Brown (Glasgow Academicals), E. A. Kerr (Glasgow Academicals), G. H. Robb (Glasgow Academicals), W. A. Walls (Glasgow Academicals), B. Allan (Glasgow Academicals), J. S. Lang (Glasgow University), R. B. Young (Glasgow University)

English matches

No other District matches played.

International matches

No touring matches this season.

References

1881–82 in Scottish rugby union
Scottish Districts seasons